The Museum of Northern History is a historic house museum located in Kirkland Lake, Ontario, Canada with more than 10,000 artifacts (photographs, objects, etc.) highlighting the social, cultural and industrial history of the Kirkland Lake region, with a particular focus in relation to mining. The museum is located in the Sir Harry Oakes Chateau. The museum also hosts several art exhibitions each year showcasing local talent of Kirkland Lake, as well as regional and international artists. The Museum also holds many arts & cultural events/activities throughout the year and is available as a rental venue for small events, or photo sessions.

Building

The building that houses the museum was built by Harry Oakes, a mining financier, in 1929. In 1981 the town of Kirkland Lake transferred ownership of the building to Ontario Heritage Trust and agreed to lease the building for 60 years, covering the cost of repairs.

References

External links
 

Historic house museums in Ontario
Kirkland Lake
Local museums in Ontario
Museums in Timiskaming District
History museums in Ontario